Marshall County Courthouse is a historic courthouse located at Plymouth, Marshall County, Indiana.  It was built between 1870 and 1872, and is a two-story, brick and limestone building in a combination of Italianate and Renaissance Revival styles.  It is rectangular in form and has a hipped roof with central bell tower.

It was listed in the National Register of Historic Places in 1983. It is located in the Plymouth Northside Historic District.

See also
East Laporte Street Footbridge
Plymouth Northside Historic District
Plymouth Southside Historic District

References

County courthouses in Indiana
Courthouses on the National Register of Historic Places in Indiana
Renaissance Revival architecture in Indiana
Italianate architecture in Indiana
Government buildings completed in 1872
Buildings and structures in Marshall County, Indiana
National Register of Historic Places in Marshall County, Indiana
Historic district contributing properties in Indiana